Henrik Robstad (born 12 May 1991) is a Norwegian footballer who plays as a defender for Start in the Tippeligaen.

He played youth football for Hånes IF and IK Start, but was dismissed from the latter club who did not perceive him as good enough. While skiing at the resort Hovden, he met Vindbjart FK head coach Steinar Skeie, who invited him to trial. Robstad subsequently joined Vindbjart and played five seasons there, only interrupted by a US college spell in 2011–12.

Ahead of the 2014 season he went from the third to the second tier, joining newly promoted FK Jerv. He joined Start ahead of the 2016 season.

Career statistics

References

1991 births
Living people
Sportspeople from Kristiansand
Norwegian footballers
Vindbjart FK players
FK Jerv players
IK Start players
Eliteserien players
Norwegian First Division players
Association football defenders